Winnisquam may refer to a location in New Hampshire, the United States:

 Lake Winnisquam
 Winnisquam, New Hampshire, a village named after the lake
 Winnisquam Regional High School, in Tilton, New Hampshire